Aglossa cacamica is a species of snout moth in the genus Aglossa.  It was described by Harrison Gray Dyar Jr. in 1913.  It is found in North America, including California.

The wingspan is 22–34 mm.

References

Moths described in 1913
Pyralini
Moths of North America